James Milton Battle  (March 26, 1901 – September 30, 1965) was a reserve infielder in Major League Baseball.

A native of Bailey, Texas, Battle played briefly for the Chicago White Sox during the  season as a backup for third baseman Willie Kamm and shortstop Roger Peckinpaugh. In a six-game majors career, Battle was a .375 (3-for-8) hitter with one triple and one run scored without home runs or RBI. He also spent parts of seven seasons in the Minor leagues with the Longview Cannibals (1924-'25), Paris Bearcats (1925-'26), Little Rock Travelers (1927), Seattle Indians (1928), Waco Cubs (1928-'29) and Dallas Steers (1929), registering a .286 average (737-for-2573) with 23 homers in 594 game appearances.

Battle died in Chico, California, at the age of 64.

See also
1923 Chicago White Sox season

References

External links
Baseball Reference – major league statistics
Baseball Reference – minor league statistics

 

Major League Baseball infielders
Chicago White Sox players
Dallas Steers players
Little Rock Travelers players
Longview Cannibals players
Paris Bearcats players
Seattle Indians players
Waco Cubs players
Baseball players from Texas
1901 births
1965 deaths
People from Fannin County, Texas